Vyšehořovice is a municipality and village in Prague-East District in the Central Bohemian Region of the Czech Republic. It has about 700 inhabitants.

Administrative parts
The village of Kozovazy is an administrative part of Vyšehořovice.

References

Villages in Prague-East District